This page covers all the important events in the sport of tennis in 1997. Primarily, it provides the results of notable tournaments throughout the year on both the ATP and WTA Tours, the Davis Cup, and the Fed Cup.

ITF

Grand Slam events

Australian Open

Men's singles:  Pete Sampras def.  Carlos Moyá, 6–2, 6–3, 6–3
Women's singles:  Martina Hingis def.  Mary Pierce, 6–2, 6–2

French Open

Men's singles:  Gustavo Kuerten def.  Sergi Bruguera, 6–3, 6–4, 6–2
Women's singles:  Iva Majoli def.  Martina Hingis, 6–4, 6–2

Wimbledon

Gentlemen's singles:  Pete Sampras def.  Cédric Pioline, 6–4, 6–2, 6–4
Ladies' singles:  Martina Hingis def.  Jana Novotná, 2–6, 6–3, 6–3

US Open

Men's singles:  Patrick Rafter def.  Greg Rusedski, 6–3, 6–2, 4–6, 7–5
Women's singles:  Martina Hingis def.  Venus Williams, 6–0, 6–4

Davis Cup

Final

Fed Cup

Final

Netherlands vs. France

ATP Tour

ATP World Tour Finals

 Pete Sampras def.  Yevgeny Kafelnikov, 6–3, 6–2, 6–2

WTA Tour

WTA Tour Championships

Singles:  Jana Novotná  defeated  Mary Pierce 7–6, 6–2, 6–3.

International Tennis Hall of Fame
Class of 1997:
Bunny Austin
Lesley Turner Bowrey
Walter Clopton Wingfield

Births
3 February – Paige Mary Hourigan, New Zealand tennis player
7 February – Anhelina Kalinina, Ukrainian tennis player
10 March – Belinda Bencic, Swiss tennis player
20 April – Alexander Zverev, Russian tennis player
26 April – Pedro Martínez, Spanish tennis player
7 May – Daria Kasatkina, Russian tennis player
8 June – Jeļena Ostapenko, Latvian tennis player
16 October – Naomi Osaka, Japanese tennis player
27 December – Ana Konjuh, Croatian tennis player

Deaths
4 February – Jimmy Tattersall, former Wimbledon Boys' Champion, 56
8 May – Pat Hughes, UK tennis (doubles) player, 94
2 June – Helen Jacobs, multi-Grand Slam-winning US tennis player, 88 
24 July – Frank Parker, US tennis player, oldest player ever to compete in the US Open men's singles, 81
7 October – Felicisimo Ampon, Filipino tennis player, 76

References

 
Tennis by year